Hermus or Hermos was a deme of ancient Attica. It lay on the sacred road to Eleusis, between the Cephissus and the Pythium, a temple of Apollo on Mount Poecilum, upon a rivulet of the same name. Here was the splendid monument of Pythonice, the wife of Harpalus.

The site of Hermus is tentatively identified with Chaidari.

References

Populated places in ancient Attica
Former populated places in Greece
Demoi